Farming, or agriculture, is the science, art and practice of cultivating plants and livestock.

Farming may also refer to:

Places
 Farming, Minnesota, an unincorporated community in the United States
 Farming Township, Stearns County, Minnesota, in the United States

Other uses
 Farming (film), a 2018 British film 
 Farming (video gaming), performing repetitious tasks usually for a gameplay advantage
 Tax farming, or farming, the privatization of tax collection
 Farming Simulator, a video game series

See also 

 Cultivation (disambiguation)
 Farm (disambiguation)
 Farmer (disambiguation)
 Baby farming, the historical practice of accepting custody of an infant or child in exchange for payment
 Gold farming, gathering currency in a game to sell for (real world) money
 Outsourcing, or "farming out"
 Pharming